Tianjin Climate Exchange (TCX) is a domestic carbon market cap-and-trade scheme exchange. Jeff Huang is assistant chairman of Tianjin Climate Exchange and vice-president of Chicago Climate Exchange.

It is China’s first integrated exchange for trading of environmental financial instruments 

TCX is a joint venture between Chicago Climate Exchange, the municipal government of Tianjin and the asset management unit of PetroChina, the country’s largest oil and gas producer.

Cap-and-trade schemes are programs under which member companies commit to lowering their greenhouse gas emissions by a certain amount in a certain period of time and trade carbon credits generated by this. As China does not have a national cap on emissions, any such scheme would be voluntary, similar to the situation in the US when the Chicago Climate Exchange launched in 2003.

History
On September 25 2008, Tianjin Climate Exchange, co-established by CNPC Assets Management Co., Ltd. (holding a 53% stake), Tianjin Property Rights Exchange (北方产权交易市场) (holding a 22% stake), and Chicago Climate Exchange (CCX) (holding a 25% stake), was unveiled in the Tianjin Binhai New Area. 

At the request of the State Council, Tianjin Climate Exchange is established as China's  first comprehensive platform for trading carbon credits under the Clean Development Mechanism, and will promote environmental protection and emission reduction by means of market and financial measures. 

Tianjin Climate Exchange has the following goals: to help enterprises cost-effectively reduce emissions of pollutants, such as sulfur dioxide, chemical oxygen demand, etc.; to help enterprises achieve maximum energy efficiency at minimum cost; to help enterprises manage environmental risks and meet increasing disclosure requirements; and to provide enterprises with integrated international emissions market access and experience. 

In 2006, Tianjin Binhai New Area was designed by the State Council of the PRC as the national experimental zone for comprehensive reforms related to financial innovation, land and administrative management.

China's Eleventh Five-Year Plan (2006-10) called for cutting energy consumption per unit of GDP up to 20 percent by 2010 while reducing major pollutants, such as sulfur dioxide (SO2) by 10 percent.[3]

Tianjin Property Rights Exchange
TPRE was launched in 1994, under government approval. It is a government agent under the charge of Tianjin SASAC and is the only appointed exchange authorized by Tianjin SASAC for state-owned assets and equities transaction. It is one of three national institutions permitted by SASAC to transact assets and equities of SOEs under control of central government.[2]

Trade products and services
Greenhouse gas emissions trading
Energy efficiency market product trading
Emissions trading based on mandatory government targets
Carbon neutral trading and other forms of voluntary carbon reduction trading
International trade in greenhouse gas emissions
Trading of emission rights for major pollutants
Sulfur dioxide emissions trading
Chemical oxygen demand emission trading
Emissions trading of nitrogen oxides and other pollutants
Comprehensive services for energy conservation and emission reduction
Integrated services for clean development mechanism (CDM) projects
Integrated services for contract energy management (EMC) projects
Low carbon solution design for region, industry and project
Other advisory services
Trading product development and design
Emission trading product development and design
Development and design of environmental financial derivatives

See also
Clean Development Mechanism
Beijing Environmental Exchange
Richard Sandor

References

http://www.chicagoclimatex.com/news/press/release_20081223_CLE_announcement.pdf
http://www.cnpc.com.cn/eng/press/newsreleases/CSR/d1495066-3c79-482a-a36b-88b834cf3f78.htm
http://www.chinadaily.com.cn/bizchina/2008-10/27/content_7144537.htm

External links
official website

Climate change in China
Carbon finance